Matteson may refer to:

Places 
 Matteson, Illinois
 Matteson, Wisconsin
 Matteson Township, Michigan

Others 
 Matteson (surname)
 Matteson (Metra), railway station in Illinois, United States
 Matteson M-1, American glider